Aladdin Bail Bonds is a chain of bail bond agents based in Carlsbad, California, United States, and owned by Endeavour Capital Fund VI. With more than 50 offices in eight states, it is one of the largest bail bond companies in the United States and the largest in California.

See also
 Bail in the United States

References

External links
 

Bail in the United States
Companies based in Carlsbad, California